Vengeance Is Mine is a 1917 American silent drama film directed by Frank Hall Crane and starring Irene Castle, Frank Sheridan, and Helene Chadwick.

The film was shot at Fort Lee in New Jersey. George Fitzmaurice worked as a supervising director.

Cast

References

Bibliography
 Donald W. McCaffrey & Christopher P. Jacobs. Guide to the Silent Years of American Cinema. Greenwood Publishing, 1999.

External links

1917 films
1917 drama films
Silent American drama films
Films directed by Frank Hall Crane
American silent feature films
1910s English-language films
Pathé Exchange films
American black-and-white films
Films shot in New Jersey
1910s American films